Nicholas Clerk (fl. 1407) was an English politician. Clerk has not been clearly identified. He was a Member (MP) of the Parliament of England for Exeter in 1407.

References

14th-century births
15th-century deaths
English MPs 1407
Members of the Parliament of England (pre-1707) for Exeter